West Virginia Route 105 (abbreviated WV Route 105 or WV 105) is an east–west state highway located within Weirton, West Virginia, United States. The western terminus of the route is at West Virginia Route 2 north of downtown Weirton. The eastern terminus is at U.S. Route 22 (exit 5) in Weirton Heights, just 1/2 mile west of the Pennsylvania state line.

All but  of WV 105 is located in Hancock County. The remaining , comprising the U.S. 22 interchange and the north approach, is situated in Brooke County.

Most of WV 105, from the intersection of Pennsylvania Avenue and Colliers Way to the western terminus at Main Street/WV 2, was originally U.S. 22 before the Robert C. Byrd Expressway was constructed.

Major intersections

References

105
Transportation in Brooke County, West Virginia
Transportation in Hancock County, West Virginia